Paid Programming (also known as Paid Programming: Icelandic Ultrablue or Icelandic UltraBlue) is a television pilot for Cartoon Network's late night programing block (Adult Swim) that premiered, unannounced, in the United States on the night of November 2, 2009, and was then re-aired every Monday through Friday night until December 4, 2009. It did not reair the night of November 23, 2009 due to a Family Guy rerun.

Paid Programming is a parody of infomercials and was created and written by H. Jon Benjamin and David Cross, and features amateur actors from Central Casting.  Although the pilot was never picked up for a full series, it received a positive reception in London when screened at monthly comedy event called "Popcorn Comedy night". Adult Swim continues to periodically rebroadcast the pilot episode.

Production
Paid Programming was created and written by H. Jon Benjamin and David Cross, and directed by Jeff Buchanan. The pilot episode was first announced at Dragon*Con 2009 in September 2009, where it was described as an "infomercial within an infomercial"; no other information was revealed at that time. Although Benjamin and Cross make voice cameos in the pilot, the cast of Paid Programming consists mainly of "non-recognizable" amateur actors from Central Casting. The pilot does not feature any credits or production cards, and ended with a cliffhanger. In a 2010 interview David Cross mentioned it was their intent to make Paid Programming as similar to a real infomercial as possible, in order to trick unsuspecting viewers into thinking it's a real infomercial; and was upset that the project was announced at Dragon*Con. According to Benjamin and Cross, Adult Swim was only "semi-committed" to the project, and was worried that it would do poorly ratings wise.  Paid Programming was not picked up as a full series, as revealed when Benjamin referred to it as an "abject failure".

Despite the pilot failing, the network greenlit more fake infomercials in 2012.

Broadcast history
Similar to the broadcast history of The Rising Son, another program on Adult Swim, the pilot episode of Paid Programming was aired in the United States on the night of November 2, 2009 at 4:30 am (ET), unannounced and unadvertised, and was listed as "SPECIAL" on the Adult Swim schedule. After its original debut, Adult Swim then re-aired the pilot every Monday through Friday night until December 4, 2009, with the exception of November 23, 2009 which saw a Family Guy rerun take its time slot. Adult Swim periodically re-airs the pilot episode, and posted it to their official site in 2015.

Plot outline
Dr. Samuelson announces the "Icelandic Ultra Blue jingle" is being retired, and urges America to submit their own entries for a new jingle. Later, after showing several entries, Dr. Samuelson announces that his nephew, Lars won the contest, with seven votes. Later, Dr. Samuelson has returned to his lab where he tells the viewer that they will buy the product. Dr. Samuelson then says "Phase one is complete" into his watch and looks up menacingly at the viewer along with the three extras in the shot. The screen then fades to black and the words "To Be Continued..." appear, abruptly ending the episode.

Products/locations featured
"Icelandic Ultra Blue Health Emphasizer", "Icelandic Ultra Blue Air purity system", "Kimmels Nazi Gold Exchange", "Fattfuck Splinter-B-Gones", "Icelandic Ultra Blue Embalm Balm", "Temptations" – a Jersey Shore nightclub, and "Icelandic Ultra Stuff" – a cream used to cure shaving bumps.

Characters
 Dr. Torsten Samuelson – A Norwegian self-proclaimed "Doctor" who has spent "thirty-six years hanging out in the medical community". Best known as the founder and lead spokesmen for Icelandic Ultra Blue.
 O'Connel Mcmicmic (Justine D'Amour) – A singer who worked with Wendy Clitlock to produce "Icelandic Eire Go Chalk", a musical entry for the "new Icelandic Ultra Blue jingle" contest.
 Wendy Clitlock – (Lou Hemsey) An award-winning record producer who serves as the spokesman for the "Icelandic Ultra Blue Air purity system".
 Mr. Kimmel (Ray Higgs) and Mrs. Kimmel – The married owners of "Kimmels Nazi Gold Exchange". After Mrs. Kimmel suffered a splinter-related death, her body was preserved using "Icelandic Ultra Blue Embalm Balm".
 Danny Fattfuck – The pants-less owner of "Fattfuck Splinter-B-Gones".
 Lars (Christopher Cusumano) – Dr. Samuelson's nephew who won the contest for the "new Icelandic Ultra Blue jingle".

Reception
During November 2009, when the pilot was aired every morning, Adult Swim received negative feedback from viewers upset that re-runs of Aqua Teen Hunger Force were replaced with the pilot Paid Programming. During November 2009, the Adult Swim Message boards were filled with posts from users who were confused and unsure of what it was.

Cross showed the pilot episode to a group of about 600–700 people in London, during a monthly comedy event called "Popcorn Comedy night". To Cross's surprise, the majority of the audience laughed so hard they missed some jokes; Cross stated, "Quite often they didn’t even get the references, but they got the context, I guess".

References

External links
 Infomercials at Adult Swim
 IcelandicUltraBlue.com
 
 Review of Paid Programming
 Interview with David Cross

Adult Swim pilots and specials
Television pilots not picked up as a series
Infomercial parodies